Juke Girl is a 1942 American drama film directed by Curtis Bernhardt, written by A. I. Bezzerides, and starring Ann Sheridan and Ronald Reagan. The supporting cast includes Richard Whorf, George Tobias, Gene Lockhart, Alan Hale Sr., Howard Da Silva, Donald MacBride, Faye Emerson, Willie Best, and Fuzzy Knight. The plot focuses on the plight of exploited farmers and farmworkers in the South.

Tagline
"Shapely Ann Sheridan is starred with Ronald Reagan in the story of a dime-a-dance girl who discovers her veneer of hardness is not so solid as she had thought."

Plot
Farm workers Steve and Danny seek jobs in the fields of Florida, where a man named Henry Madden runs a packing plant and uses strong-arm tactics while preventing many farmers from selling their crops.

Steve meets and falls in love with Lola Mears, a "juke girl" employed at Muckeye John's club. They befriend farmer Nick Garcos, whose attempt to sell his tomatoes in Atlanta is foiled by Madden's henchman Cully.

Danny turns against his friend Steve, deciding to work for Madden. In a fight, Nick is killed by Madden, who then attempts to frame Steve and Lola for murder. Madden's crime is uncovered, resulting in Steve and Lola leaving town to begin a new life.

Cast
 Ann Sheridan as Lola Mears
 Ronald Reagan as Steve Talbot
 Richard Whorf as Danny Frazier
 George Tobias as Nick Garcos
 Gene Lockhart as Henry Madden
 Alan Hale as Yippee
 Betty Brewer as Skeeter
 Howard Da Silva as Cully
 Donald MacBride as "Muckeye" John
 Willard Robertson as Mister Just
 Faye Emerson as Violet "Murph" Murphy
 Willie Best as Jo-Mo

Production
The picture was released the following month after the classic Kings Row, which also stars Sheridan and Reagan as a couple.

References

External links
Juke Girl at IMDb
Juke Girl at TCMDB

1942 films
1942 drama films
American black-and-white films
American drama films
Films about agriculture
Films about the labor movement
Films directed by Curtis Bernhardt
Films scored by Adolph Deutsch
Films set in Florida
Warner Bros. films
1940s English-language films
1940s American films